D. Sherman West (August 9, 1885 – September 3, 1973) was an American politician from the state of Iowa.

West was born in Moulton, Appanoose County, Iowa in 1885. He served as a Democrat in the Iowa Senate from 1949 to 1953. He died in Brownsville, Cameron County, Texas in 1973. He was interred in Fairview Cemetery in Udell, Iowa.

References

1885 births
1973 deaths
Iowa Democrats